Musulin is a Serbian and Croatian surname.  At least 129 individuals with the surname died at the Jasenovac concentration camp.

It may refer to:

Branka Musulin (1917–1975), Croatian-born German classical pianist
George Musulin (1914–1987), Serbian-American officer of the Office of Strategic Services and naval intelligence services, and from 1950 onward a CIA agent
Nikola Musulin, Serbian poet
Stjepan Musulin (1885–1969), Croatian linguist
Toni Musulin (born 1970), former security driver, stole €11.6 million from Banque de France

References

Serbian surnames
Croatian surnames